John Ferron House is a historic home located in Londonderry Township, Chester County, Pennsylvania. It is located opposite St. Malachi Church, and was the property of the church's builder / carpenter John Ferron.  It was built about 1838, and is a two-story, two bay, banked stone dwelling with a gable roof.  It has a shed roofed frame addition.  Also on the property is a contributing root cellar with an arched brick entry.

It was added to the National Register of Historic Places in 1985.

References

Houses on the National Register of Historic Places in Pennsylvania
Houses completed in 1838
Houses in Chester County, Pennsylvania
National Register of Historic Places in Chester County, Pennsylvania